Alexander Grant (20 May 1734 – 8 May 1813) was a Royal Navy officer, businessman, and politician in Upper Canada. During his service with the Royal Navy Grant saw action in the Seven Years' War before becoming a naval superintendent. He then embarked on a career in the ship building industry before losing much of his wealth during the American Revolution. Grant recovered, however, and rose to prominence in civil society, becoming the administrator of Upper Canada in 1805.

Naval career 

Grant entered the Royal Navy in 1755 and saw service in North America, on Lake Champlain, during the Seven Years' War. Grant became a naval superintendent in 1763, with his headquarters on Navy Island (in the Niagara River), before moving to Detroit, Michigan. His headquarters again changed, every winter, during which time the regiment was in New York City, up to 1774.

Merchant career 

He began to build his own vessels, essentially selling them to himself at a considerable profit. He built a commercial empire by also selling or renting ships to merchants and this was initially solidified during the American Revolution during which he was given military command of most of the Great Lakes.

However, in the course of the revolution Grant lost much of his income with the loss of 12,000 acres (49 km²) of land he owned in New York, and the end of his participation in private shipping.

Civil career 

Grant recovered, however, and rose to prominence in civil society, being appointed a justice of the peace in 1786 and, to a succession of governmental and political positions (in both Upper Canada and Lower Canada), he joined the Executive Council of Upper Canada under governor John Graves Simcoe as well as the Legislative Council. In 1799, Grant became a deputy superintendent of Indian Affairs.

In August 1805, Grant became administrator of Upper Canada, upon the death of Lieutenant-Governor Peter Hunter, and continued Hunter's policies until a new lieutenant governor, Francis Gore, arrived from Britain, in August 1806.

Grant died in 1813 at his home Castle Grant in Grosse Pointe Farms near Detroit and was buried on the other side of the Detroit River in Sandwich, now Windsor, Ontario.

References

External links 
Biography at the Dictionary of Canadian Biography Online
Biography at the Biography Research Guide
Alexander Grant at Ontario Plaques

1734 births
1813 deaths
Alexander
Lieutenant-Governors of Upper Canada
Members of the Legislative Council of Upper Canada
Military personnel from Inverness
Scottish emigrants to pre-Confederation Ontario
Royal Navy officers
Canadian justices of the peace